Alexandru Mihai Dedu (born 15 September 1971 in Ploiești) is a retired Romanian handballer who played for the Romanian national team in line player position.

He was part of the Romanian team which ranked eight at the 1992 Summer Olympic Games in Barcelona.

On 10 February 2014, Dedu has been elected President of the Romanian Handball Federation (FRH) for a four-year tenure, replacing Cristian Gațu (1996–2014).

Honours
Poli Timişoara
Romanian Liga Naţională: 1990–91

Steaua București
Romanian Liga Naţională: 1993–94, 1995–96

Barcelona
Liga ASOBAL: 1996–97, 1997–98, 1998–99
Copa del Rey: 1996–97, 1997–98
Supercopa ASOBAL: 1996–97, 1997–98
EHF Champions League: 1996–97, 1997–98, 1998–99
EHF Super Cup: 1997–98, 1998–99

Porto
Portuguese League: 2001–02, 2002–03, 2003–04
Portuguese League Cup: 2003–04
Portuguese Super Cup: 2000, 2002

References

External links
Official website 
Profile of Alexandru Dedu at Sports Reference

1971 births
Living people
Sportspeople from Ploiești
CSA Steaua București (handball) players
FC Porto handball players
FC Barcelona Handbol players
Liga ASOBAL players
Handball-Bundesliga players
Handball players at the 1992 Summer Olympics
Olympic handball players of Romania
Romanian male handball players
Expatriate handball players
Romanian expatriate sportspeople in France
Romanian expatriate sportspeople in Spain
Romanian expatriate sportspeople in Germany
Romanian expatriate sportspeople in Portugal
Presidents of the Romanian Handball Federation